On the 25 October elections numerous provinces also elected governors, with the new ones beginning their terms on 10 December 2015. These provinces were Buenos Aires province, Catamarca, Chubut, Entre Ríos, Formosa, Jujuy, La Pampa, Misiones, San Juan, San Luis and Santa Cruz, encompassing 11 of the country's 23 provinces. The other provinces elected governors in different days of 2015; the only exceptions were Corrientes and Santiago del Estero whose governors' terms were not due to finish in 2015.

María Eugenia Vidal was elected governor of the populous Buenos Aires Province, defeating the controversial Aníbal Fernández; her victory influenced as well the growth of Macri in the presidential elections. Similarly, the unpopular Fernández may have subtracted non-Kirchnerite votes from Scioli. The victory was considered significant given that Fernández is the incumbent Cabinet Chief of the Kirchner administration, and that Vidal is directly replacing Daniel Scioli's current post as governor of the province. It is made more significant as she is the first female governor of the province, and the first non-Peronist governor since 1987. The Republican Proposal also retained the city of Buenos Aires, that elected Horacio Rodríguez Larreta as the new mayor. The PRO stronghold had gone to a second round between Larreta and Martín Lousteau (also of the Cambiemos front, but not in the same party) after the Front for Victory's Mariano Recalde finished third. Juan Schiaretti won the elections in Córdoba, and he is the single governor of the UNA ticket. The socialist Miguel Lifschitz was elected governor of Santa Fe, after a controversial triple tie with the PJ and PRO. Carlos Verna was reelected governor of La Pampa.

The votes in Entre Ríos had a slow count. During a week, the provisional results suggested that Gustavo Bordet may be the new governor of Entre Ríos, but Alfredo de Angeli claimed that the uncounted votes may turn the tide and make him the winner instead. The final results were released on October 30, confirming the victory of Bordet. Hugo Passalacqua, vice governor of Maurice Closs was elected governor by a wide margin.

Rosana Bertone was elected governor of Tierra del Fuego. The radical Eduardo Costa got the higher number of votes in Santa Cruz, but Alicia Kirchner was elected governor, thanks to the Ley de Lemas. The former governor of Chubut Mario Das Neves was elected again. Neuquén and Río Negro elected Omar Gutiérrez and Alberto Weretilneck, who ran for local parties.

Mendoza provided an early victory for the opposition, by the radical Alfredo Cornejo. Alberto Rodríguez Saá was elected governor of San Luis once again. The Front for Victory retained the provinces of San Juan and La Rioja, with Sergio Uñac and Sergio Casas.

Lucía Corpacci was reelected in Catamarca. Juan Manuel Urtubey got an important victory in Salta against Romero, and kept the province for the FPV. The radical Gerardo Morales was elected governor of Jujuy, the first non-Peronist one since the return of democracy in 1983. He expects to have a tense relation with the populist Milagro Sala. Juan Luis Manzur was elected governor of Tucumán, but the denounces of electoral fraud became a national scandal. The elections were first declared null by  local judge, and then ratified by the local Supreme Court. The case is currently held by the national Supreme Court.

See also
 List of current provincial governors in Argentina

Notes

References

Provincial elections in Argentina
2015 elections in Argentina